TRSS may refer to:

Titirangi Rudolf Steiner School, a Waldorf school in Auckland, New Zealand
Tri-Ratna Secondary School, a school established in 1993 for Buthanese refugees in eastern Nepal
 TrSS, Ship prefix for a Triple-Screw Steamship